Poovathussery is a village in the border between Ernakulam district and Thrissur district of  Kerala, India. It is situated on the banks of Chalakudy River and has several paddy lands and coconut trees. Most of the people are farmers.The farmers of this pristine village have suffered a lot of damages first during the floods of 2018 and later on in 2022 due to heavy winds and whirlwinds. The main agricultural produce in this village is coconut, nutmeg and banana plantation. Most of nutmeg crops were uprooted during the heavy winds of  april 2022

Religion 
Poovathussery hosts The Poovathussery Karthyayini temple which is one of the 108 Durga Temples. It also contains the St Joseph Church.

References 

Villages in Thrissur district